, along with his father Masashige and brothers Masanori and Masatoki, was a supporter of the Southern Imperial Court during Japan's Nanbokucho Wars.

Masatsura was one of the primary military leaders who revived the Southern Court in the 1340s. The Court had had little to no resources for three years; the strategy was too focused on defending their base at Yoshino, and not on gaining allies, land, or income. The Kusunoki family, and Masatsura in particular, fought to gain power and support for the Emperor. In 1347, Masatsura led an attack on bakufu (shogunate) sympathizers in Kii Province and ended up attracting supporters from Kii, as well as Izumi and Settsu Provinces. When the Shōgun's Northern Court sent Hosokawa Akiuji to stop him, Masatsura met Hosokawa and defeated him at Sakainoura. Because of his loyalty Emperor Go-Daigo rewarded him with the most beautiful woman in the palace, called Ben-Naishi, as his wife. After several more campaigns against the bakufu, Masatsura was killed in the Battle of Shijō Nawate, in February 1348 at the age of 22.

Before he died, he composed a death poem on the Nyoirin-ji temple door in Yoshino, the location of Go-Daigo's tomb:

帰へらじと
兼ねて思へば
梓弓
亡き数に入る
名をぞとどむる

kaeraji to
kanete omoeba
azusayumi
nakikazu ni iru
na wo zotodomuru

I could not return, I presume
So I will keep my name
Among those who are dead with bows.

In popular culture

In Equinox Flower (彼岸花, Higanbana), a 1958 color Japanese film directed by Yasujirō Ozu, one of the characters declaims a poet "based on a death poem of patriot Kusunoki Masatsura". Whether it has to do with the above poem is unknown.

An approximate translation is :

My father's precepts are engraved in my heart.
I will faithfully follow the emperor's edict.
10 years of patience, and finally the time has come.
Strike a powerful blow
for the emperor's cause we are struggling now.
To fight and die as men, we make an oath.
We, 143 companions of war, united as one,
determined to fight until victory, yes, we are.
By dying, heroes earn an immortal glory,
the cowards suffer an eternal shame.
With the edges of our arrows, we engrave our story,
the blades of our swords shine in the evening.
Against the approaching enemy, let's walk with the same step,
At their general, let's give the final blow.

References

1326 births
1348 deaths
Samurai
Japanese warriors killed in battle
Deified Japanese people